Tom and Jerry: Cowboy Up! is a 2022 American animated direct-to-video Western comedy film starring Tom and Jerry, produced by Warner Bros. Animation. It is the first Tom and Jerry direct-to-video animated film in five years since 2017's Tom and Jerry: Willy Wonka and the Chocolate Factory, and a continuation of the film series. It is also the first Tom and Jerry direct-to-video animated film to feature the animation services by Renegade Animation, the studio that animated The Tom and Jerry Show (2014–21) and Tom and Jerry in New York. It was released to DVD and digital in the United States and Canada on January 25, 2022.

Plot 
Tom and Jerry put aside their differences to help a cowgirl and her brother save their homestead from a greedy land grabber, with the help of three of Jerry's nephews and a group of prairie dogs.

Cast 
 William Hanna (archival audio recordings) as Tom Cat and Jerry Mouse (uncredited)
 George Ackles as The Marshal
 Sean Burgos as Bumpy
 Trevor Devall as Duke
 Chris Edgerly as August Critchley
 Georgie Kidder as Scruffy
 Justin Michael as Bentley
 Kaitlyn Robrock as Betty
 Isaac Robinson Smith as Zeb
 Kath Soucie as Tuffy
 Stephen Stanton as Virgil
 Fred Tatasciore as Clem
 Kari Wahlgren as Duffy, Jane

Release 
The movie was released on DVD and Digital by Warner Bros. Home Entertainment (through Studio Distribution Services). in the United States and Canada on January 25, 2022. Nearly five months later, its television premiere premiered on Cartoon Network on June 18, 2022, at 6pm Eastern/5pm Central, and then streamed on HBO Max the next day.

References

External links 
 

2022 films
2022 animated films
2022 comedy films
2022 direct-to-video films
2022 Western (genre) films
2020s American animated films
2020s children's animated films
2020s English-language films
American children's animated comedy films
American Western (genre) comedy films
Direct-to-video comedy films
Films directed by Darrell Van Citters
Films set in 1882
Films set in Texas
Tom and Jerry films
Warner Bros. Animation animated films
Warner Bros. direct-to-video animated films
Western (genre) animated films